KKSU-LD channel 21 is an independent television station licensed to Manhattan, Kansas, and is owned by Kansas State University.

Callsign history
Originally licensed as K21ER in 1995 (actual sign-on date unknown), the station was renamed as KKSU-LP in December 2002, about a month after K-State's radio station KKSU (AM), left the air for good.

As of February 18, 2016 the official station designation changed to KKSU-LD due to the new digital high-definition transmitter now broadcasting the station's signal. The current FCC license for the station is active until June 1, 2022. The station can be viewed through off-air broadcast or through Wildcat Cable (on the Kansas State University campus) on Channel 21 throughout Riley County and into parts of Geary and Pottowatomie County, or through Cox Cable on Channel 8 from Wamego to Junction City.

External links

Kansas State University
Television stations in Kansas
Television channels and stations established in 1995
1995 establishments in Kansas
Classic Arts Showcase affiliates
Low-power television stations in the United States